Pisarek is a surname. Notable people with the surname include:

Avraham Pisarek (1901–1983), German photographer
Kasia Pisarek (born Katarzyna Krzyżagórska), Polish art expert
Maciej Pisarek (born 1966), Polish film director and screenplay writer
Marian Pisarek (1912–1942), Polish fighter pilot and  flying ace of World War II